Fort Cascades was a United States Army fort constructed in 1855 to protect the portage road around the final section of the Cascades Rapids, known as the "lower cascades."  It was built on the Washington side of the Columbia River, between the present site of North Bonneville and the Bonneville Dam in Skamania County.

It was burned in 1856, then rebuilt, but abandoned in 1861.  A small community, Cascades, formed around the fort, but the largest flood of the Columbia River in recorded history passed over both the townsite and the fort site in 1894.  Cascades served as the county seat of Skamania County prior to 1893, when the county records were moved to Stevenson,

In 1867, decades before the disastrous floods, famed photographer Carleton Eugene Watkins arrived on the scene.  Watkins took a commission from the Oregon Steam Ship Navigation Company to document areas of the Columbia River, with "Cascades" featuring prominently in his Pacific Coast stereoviews collection.  Approximately 50 Watkins stereoscopic images of the Cascades area are known to exist, ranging from serials 1250-1302.  Labeled "Upper Cascades," "Cascades" and "Lower Cascades," these photographs feature river view landscapes as well as images of the town and fort blockhouses.  Aside from capturing scenery, Watkins documents saw mills, as well as train and riverboat traffic vital to the local economy at that time.  A few of the images provide a glimpse of salmon fishing before the rapids were submerged by the construction of the Bonneville Dam.  Although his negatives were destroyed in the great 1906 San Francisco earthquake, many of his printed images can be found in museums and private collections around the world.

Fort Cascades is now on the National Register of Historic Places. There is a self-guided tour through what remains of the fort and the townsite. There is also a replica of a rock covered with petroglyphs that was originally located at the site but has since been moved to Stevenson.

Fort Cascades is one of several forts built to protect the portage around the Cascade Rapids.  Others are Fort Raines and Fort Lugenbeel.

References

External links 
Lewis and Clark's Columbia River - Fort Cascades
The Stereoviews of Carleton Watkins
The Columbia River, A Photographic Journey - Flood of 1894
Fort Cascades - Fort Wiki with photos and information
History and directions from Friends of the Columbia River Gorge

Columbia River Gorge
Closed installations of the United States Army
Protected areas of Skamania County, Washington
Cascades
Buildings and structures in Skamania County, Washington
Cascades
1855 establishments in Washington Territory
National Register of Historic Places in Skamania County, Washington